Pseudoprocometis is a genus of moths of the family Xyloryctidae.

Species
 Pseudoprocometis baronella Viette, 1956
 Pseudoprocometis helle Viette, 1952
 Pseudoprocometis robletella Viette, 1956

References

Xyloryctidae
Xyloryctidae genera